Anheuser-Busch Brewery is a brewery complex in St. Louis, Missouri.

The brewery, opened in 1852 by German immigrant Adolphus Busch, is designated as a National Historic Landmark District. The Anheuser-Busch Brewery public tours offer hundreds of tourists the chance to experience culture native to St. Louis daily. The paid tour takes visitors through the complex, and those of the legal age can drink an included glass of an Anheuser-Busch product in the Hospitality Room after the tour. Tourists can see beer being made and packaged in a working part of the brewery.

An important place to see at the Anheuser-Busch Brewery is the old Lyon Schoolhouse Museum. As one of the oldest school buildings in St Louis it served as the head offices of the brewery after 1907. The museum is loaded with rare mementos gathered from the founding of the company to current day. Also, the museum holds pictures of the brewery and its expansion over the years. Some of the tours visit this historic museum and can sample some of the many Budwieser products produced.

The company keeps a rotation of its famous Budweiser Clydesdales at its headquarters; the historic draft horses were originally used to pull wagons carrying beer in the 19th-century days of the company. Visitors to the brewery can observe the Clydesdales in their exercise field and see their places in the carriage house.

Some of the herd is kept at the company farm in St. Louis County. Known as Grant's Farm (having been owned by former President Ulysses S. Grant at one time), this complex is home to a menagerie of animals such as elephants, tortoises, and a variety of exotic hooved mammals.  Since 2008, approximately half of the Budweiser Clydesdales have been kept at the Warm Springs Ranch near Booneville, Missouri.

The brewery was designated a U.S. National Historic Landmark in 1966, recognizing the company's importance in the history of beer brewing and distribution in the United States. The Brew House, built in 1891-1892, is particularly notable for its "multi-storied hop chandeliers, intricate iron-work, and utilization of natural light".

See also
List of National Historic Landmarks in Missouri
National Register of Historic Places listings in St. Louis south and west of downtown

References

External links 

Anheuser Busch Brewery Tour Official Website
Anheuser Busch Brewery Tour Photo Gallery

Brewery buildings in the United States
Buildings and structures in St. Louis
Industrial buildings and structures on the National Register of Historic Places in Missouri
Landmarks of St. Louis
Tourist attractions in St. Louis
Anheuser-Busch
Historic districts on the National Register of Historic Places in Missouri
National Historic Landmarks in Missouri
National Register of Historic Places in St. Louis
1875 establishments in Missouri